Latgalian (latgalīšu volūda) is an Eastern Baltic language belonging to the Baltic branch often spoken in Latgale, the eastern part of Latvia. Nevertheless, its standardized form is recognized and protected as a "historical language of Latvia" (vēsturiska valoda Latvijā) under national law. The 2011 Latvian census established that 8.8% of Latvia's inhabitants, or 164,500 people, speak Latgalian daily. 97,600 of them live in Latgale, 29,400 in Riga and 14,400 in the  Riga Planning Region.

History 

Originally Latgalians were a tribe living in modern Vidzeme and Latgale. It is thought that they spoke the Latvian language, which later spread through the rest of modern Latvia, absorbing features of the Old Curonian, Semigallian, Selonian and Livonian languages. The Latgale area became politically separated during the Polish–Swedish wars, remaining part of the Polish–Lithuanian Commonwealth as the Inflanty Voivodeship, while the rest of the Latvians lived in lands dominated by Baltic German nobility. Both centuries of separate development and the influence of different prestige languages likely contributed to the development of modern Latgalian as distinct from the language spoken in Vidzeme and other parts of Latvia.

The modern Latgalian literary tradition started to develop in the 18th century from vernaculars spoken by Latvians in the eastern part of Latvia. The first surviving book published in Latgalian is "Evangelia toto anno" (Gospels for the whole year) in 1753. The first systems of orthography were borrowed from Polish and used Antiqua letters. It was very different from the German-influenced orthography, usually written in Blackletter or Gothic script, used for the Latvian language in the rest of Latvia. Many Latgalian books in the late 18th and early 19th century were authored by Jesuit priests, who came from various European countries to Latgale as the north-eastern outpost of the Roman Catholic religion; their writings included religious literature, calendars, and poetry.

Publishing books in the Latgalian language along with the Lithuanian was forbidden from 1865 to 1904. The ban on using Latin letters in this part of the Russian Empire followed immediately after the January Uprising, where insurgents in Poland, Lithuania, and Latgale had challenged the czarist rule. During the ban, only a limited number of smuggled Catholic religious texts and some hand-written literature were available, e.g. calendars written by the self-educated peasant Andryvs Jūrdžys.

After the repeal of the ban in 1904, there was a quick rebirth of the Latgalian literary tradition; first newspapers, textbooks, and grammar appeared. In 1918 Latgale became part of the newly created Latvian state. From 1920 to 1934 the two literary traditions of Latvians developed in parallel. A notable achievement during this period was the original translation of the New Testament into Latgalian by the priest and scholar Aloizijs Broks, published in Aglona in 1933. After the coup staged by Kārlis Ulmanis in 1934, the subject of the Latgalian dialect was removed from the school curriculum and was invalidated for use in state institutions; this was as part of an effort to standardize Latvian language usage. Latgalian survived as a spoken language in Soviet Latvia (1940–1991) while printed literature in Latgalian virtually ceased between 1959 and 1989. In emigration, some Latgalian intellectuals continued to publish books and studies of the Latgalian language, most notably Mikeļs Bukšs, see the bibliography.

Since the restoration of Latvian independence, there has been a noticeable increase in interest in the Latgalian language and cultural heritage. It is taught as an optional subject in some universities; in Rēzekne the Publishing House of Latgalian Culture Centre (Latgales kultūras centra izdevniecība) led by Jānis Elksnis, prints both old and new books in Latgalian.

In 1992, Juris Cibuļs together with Lidija Leikuma published one of the first Latgalian Alphabet books after the restoration of the language.

In the 21st century, the Latgalian language has become more visible in Latvia's cultural life. Apart from its preservation movements, Latgalian can be more often heard in different interviews on the national TV channels, and there are modern rock groups such as Borowa MC and Dabasu Durovys singing in Latgalian who have had moderate success also throughout the country. Today, Latgalian is also found in written form on public signs, such as some street names and shop signs, evidences of growing use in the linguistic landscape.

Classification 
Latgalian is a member of the Eastern Baltic branch of the Baltic group of languages included in the family of Indo-European languages. The branch also includes Latvian, Samogitian and Lithuanian. Latgalian is a moderately inflected language; the number of verb and noun forms is characteristic of many other Baltic and Slavic languages (see Inflection in Baltic Languages).

Geographic distribution 

Latgalian is spoken by about 150,000 people, mainly in Latgale, Latvia; there are small Latgalian-speaking communities in Siberia, Russia.

Official status 
Between 1920 and 1934 Latgalian was used in local government and education in Latgale. Now Latgalian is not used as an official language anywhere in Latvia. It is formally protected by the Latvian Language Law stating that "The Latvian State ensures the preservation, protection, and development of the Latgalian literary language as a historical variant of the Latvian language" (§3.4). The law regards Latgalian and Standard Literary Latvian as two equal variants of the same Latvian language. Even though such legal status allows usage of Latgalian in state affairs and education spheres, it still happens quite rarely.

There is a state-supported orthography commission of the Latgalian language. Whether the Latgalian language is a separate language or a dialect of Latvian has been a matter of heated debate throughout the 20th century. Proponents of Latgalian such as linguists Antons Breidaks and Lidija Leikuma have suggested Latgalian has the characteristics of an independent language.

Dialects 

Latgalian speakers can be classified into three main groups – Northern, Central, and Southern. These three groups of local accents are entirely mutually intelligible and characterized only by minor changes in vowels, diphthongs, and some inflexion endings. The regional accents of central Latgale (such as those spoken in the towns and rural municipalities of Juosmuiža, Vuorkova, Vydsmuiža, Viļāni, Sakstygols, Ūzulaine, Makašāni, Drycāni, Gaigalova, Bierži, Tiļža, and Nautrāni) form the phonetical basis of the modern standard Latgalian language. The literature of the 18th century was more influenced by the Southern accents of Latgalian.

Alphabet 

The Latgalian language uses an alphabet with 35 letters. The letter  survives from the pre-1957 Latvian orthography, but is being used less during modern times in Latgalian and is being replaced by two letters  that represent the same sound.

The IETF language tags have registered subtags for the 1929 orthography and the 2007 orthography.

Language examples

Poem of Armands Kūceņš
Tik skrytuļam ruodīs: iz vītys jis grīžās,
A brauciejam breinums, kai tuoli ceļš aizvess,
Tai vuorpsteite cīši pret sprāduoju paušās,
Jei naatteik – vacei gi dzejis gols zvaigznēs.

Pruots naguorbej ramu, juos lepneibu grūžoj,
Vys jamās pa sovam ļauds pasauli puormeit,
Bet nak jau sevkuram vīns kuorsynoj myužu
I ramaņu jumtus līk īguodu kuormim.

Na vysim tai sadar kai kuošam ar speini,
Sirds narymst i nabeidz par sātmalim tēmēt,
A pruots rauga skaitejs pa rokstaudža zeimem,
Kai riedeits, kod saulei vēļ vaiņuku jēme.

Lord's Prayer
Tāvs myusu, kas esi debesīs,
svēteits lai tūp Tovs vōrds.
Lai atnōk Tova vaļsteiba.
Tova vaļa lai nūteik, kai debesīs, 
tai ari vērs zemes.
Myusu ikdīneiškū maizi dūd mums šudiņ.
Un atlaid mums myusu porōdus,
kai ari mes atlaižam sovim porōdnīkim.
Un naīved myusu kārdynōšonā, 
bet izglōb myusus nu ļauna Amen.

Phrasebook

Common words in Latgalian and Lithuanian, different from Latvian 
Note the impact of foreign influences on Latvian (German in Kurzeme and Vidzeme, Polish and Lithuanian in Latgale).

See also 

 Latgalian Wikipedia
 Samogitian language

References

External links 

 Latvian–Latgalian Dictionary
 Sanita Lazdiņa, Heiko F. Marten: Latgalian in Latvia: A Continuous Struggle for Political Recognition. In: Journal on Ethnopolitics and Minority Issues in Europe
 The Two Literary Traditions of Latvians
 Some facts about Latgalian language
 The Grammar of Latgalian Language (in Latvian, PDF document)

East Baltic languages
Languages of Latvia
Articles citing ISO change requests
Languages of Russia
Vulnerable languages